The men's parallel bars competition was an inaugural event at the World Artistic Gymnastics Championships. It has been held in every year since its inception.

The first event was in 1903, and followed every other year until and including 1913. Competitions were not held during World War I, ultimately returning in 1922, and was then held every fourth year, until and including 1942. Competitions resumed after World War II, starting in 1950. It continued every fourth even year until and including 1978.  The next event was held a year later, when the schedule was switched to an every-odd year until and including 1991. It then became an annual event, until and including 1997. It was next held in 1999. During the 21st century, the World Championships became an annual event held each non-Summer Olympic year.

Three medals are awarded: gold for first place, silver for second place, and bronze for third place. Tie breakers have not been used in every year. In the event of a tie between two gymnasts, both names are listed, and the following position (second for a tie for first, third for a tie for second) is left empty because a medal was not awarded for that position.

Medalists

Bold numbers in brackets denotes record number of victories.

All-time medal count
Last updated after the 2022 World Championships.

Notes
  Official FIG documents credit medals earned by athletes from Bohemia as medals for Czechoslovakia. 
  Official FIG documents credit medals earned by athletes from Austria-Hungary as medals for Yugoslavia. 
  Official FIG documents credit medals earned by athletes from former Soviet Union at the 1992 World Artistic Gymnastics Championships in Paris, France, as medals for CIS (Commonwealth of Independent States).
  At the 1993 World Artistic Gymnastics Championships in Birmingham, Great Britain, Azerbaijani-born athlete Valery Belenky earned a bronze medal competing as an unattached athlete (UNA) because Azerbaijan did not have a gymnastics federation for him to compete. Later, official FIG documents credit his medal as a medal for Germany.

Multiple medalists

References

World Artistic Gymnastics Championships